Sundaram Verma is an Indian environmentalist. He was awarded Padma Shri, India's fourth-highest civilian award in 2020, for developing the agricultural technique called ‘dryland agroforestry' which was developed to help tree plantation efforts in arid regions of India.

Early life and career
Verma is a resident of the village called Danta located in Sikar, Rajasthan. After completing his graduation in 1972, Verma decided to pursue farming as a career. Verma studied dryland farming at the Indian Agricultural Research Institute in New Delhi through Krishi Vigyan Kendra (KVK). After working for 10 years, Verma developed a farming technique for arid regions wherein all kind of trees can be planted with just one litre of water. To date,  Verma has planted over 50,000 trees.

References

.

Recipients of the Padma Shri
Living people
Indian farmers
Indian environmentalists
Year of birth missing (living people)